Fateh Chand College for Women (Lahore), Hisar or FC College, Hisar is a public funded college located in  Hisar in the Indian state of Haryana for fodder research and training.

History
In 1935, it was established in Lahore (current Pakistan) by Rai Fateh Chand and after the partition of India in 1947, it was rehabilitated at Hisar in 1954.

Details 
The college offers undergraduate and post-graduate courses in arts, science, commerce, business, computer and electronics.

Notable alumni
 FC College at Lahore
 Teji Bachhan, mother of Amitabh Bachhan taught English there.
Krishna Sobti (did not graduate; her education was halted by the Partition)
 FC College relocated to Hisar
 Krishna Poonia, winner of gold medal for Discus Throw in 2010 Delhi Commonwealth Games

See also 
 List of Universities and Colleges in Hisar
 List of schools in Hisar
 List of institutions of higher education in Haryana

External links 
 Official website
 Google map

References 

Universities and colleges in Hisar (city)